Henrik Arnstad (born 2 May 1967) is a Swedish journalist, author and historian.

References

1967 births
Living people
Swedish male writers